Lieutenant Colonel Sir Ian Frank Bowater  (16 December 1904 – 1 October 1982) served as Lord Mayor of London from 1969 to 1970.

Career
The youngest son of Sir Frank Bowater, 1st Baronet (Lord Mayor from 1938 to 1939), and Ethel Anita Fryar, he was educated at Eton, then Magdalen College, Oxford.

Just before the onset of war in 1939, Bowater was appointed one of HM Lieutenants of the City of London. During the Second World War, he served with distinction reaching the rank of lieutenant colonel in the service of the Royal Artillery (Territorial Army), for which he was decorated with the awards of Companion of the Distinguished Service Order (DSO) in 1945 and the Territorial Decoration (TD). He later became Sheriff of the City of London in 1965 and was invested as a Knight Bachelor in 1967.

Bowater later served as Lord Mayor of London between 1969 and 1970 and was invested as an Knight of the Most Venerable Order of the Hospital of Saint John of Jerusalem (KStJ) and as a Knight Grand Cross of the Order of the British Empire (GBE) in 1970. 
In 1966, Bowater received the Grand Decoration of Honour in Silver for Services to the Republic of Austria. He also became chairman of Bowater Hotels.

Marriage and issue
On 10 December 1927 he married The Hon. Ursula Margaret Dawson (1907 - 16 November 1999), they had four children; three daughters and a son. Bowater is the grandfather of actor Damian Lewis.

See also 
 Lord Mayor of London

References

Sources
 Charles Mosley, editor, Burke's Peerage, Baronetage & Knightage, 107th edition, 3 volumes (Wilmington, Delaware, U.S.A.: Burke's Peerage (Genealogical Books) Ltd, 2003), volume 1, page 456.

1904 births
1982 deaths
People educated at Eton College
Alumni of Magdalen College, Oxford
Younger sons of baronets
Graduates of the Royal Military College, Sandhurst
Royal Artillery officers
British Army personnel of World War II
Knights Grand Cross of the Order of the British Empire
Recipients of the Grand Decoration for Services to the Republic of Austria
Knights Bachelor
Knights of the Order of St John
Sheriffs of the City of London
20th-century lord mayors of London
20th-century English politicians
Companions of the Distinguished Service Order